Bulboctenus is a genus of South American wandering spiders. It was first described by M. P. Pereira, F. M. Labarque and D. Polotow in 2020, and it has only been found in Brazil.  it contains only three species: B. itunaitata, B. kayapo, and B. munduruku.

See also
 List of Ctenidae species

References

Ctenidae genera
Spiders of Brazil